Magnolia salicifolia, also known as willow-leafed magnolia or anise magnolia, originates from Japan.  It is a small deciduous tree 7.5 m (25 ft) tall, with narrow lanceolate leaves with whitened undersides. The leaves are not as narrow as true willows (Salix), but is narrow compared to other magnolias, giving this tree a finer texture. The 10 cm-wide scented flowers emerge in early spring before the leaves. The leaves and bark are fragrant when crushed.

The cultivar 'Wada's Memory', with double white scented flowers, has gained the Royal Horticultural Society's Award of Garden Merit.

Gallery

References

External links
Magnolia salicifolia images at the Arnold Arboretum of Harvard University Plant Image Database
Gapinski, Andrew. "Magnolia salicifolia 'Grape Expectation'." Arnold Arboretum of Harvard University website, 16 April 2014. Accessed 21 April 2020.
"Magnolia salicifolia 'Wada's Memory' by Arborway Gate, Spring 2018." Library Featured Images, Arnold Arboretum of Harvard University website, 23 April 2018. Accessed 21 April 2020.
Photo of flowers

salicifolia
Trees of Japan